Amos Humiston (April 26, 1830 – July 1, 1863) was a Union soldier who died in the Battle of Gettysburg.

Civil War
Humiston served in the Union Army during the American Civil War. Having previously been wounded at the Battle of Chancellorsville, he was killed in action on the Gettysburg Battlefield, dying with his children's image that his wife had mailed to him months earlier.  A local girl found the image, and Dr. John Francis Bourns saw it at the girl's father's tavern and subsequently publicized the image: "wounded, he had laid himself down to die. In his hands … was an ambrotype containing the portraits of three small children … two boys and a girl ... nine, seven and five years of age, the boys being respectively the oldest and youngest of the three. The youngest boy is sitting in a high chair, and on each side of him are his brother and sister. The eldest boy's jacket is made from the same material as his sister's dress ... [It is] desired that all papers in the country will draw attention [so] the family … may come into possession of it" (The Philadelphia Inquirer, October 19, 1863).

Humiston's wife in Portville, New York—who hadn't received a letter from her husband since the Battle of Gettysburg—responded to the photograph's description in the American Presbyterian of October 29. She subsequently confirmed the image after Bourns sent her a carte de visite copy of the image.  Bourns took the original image to Humiston's widow.

The family subsequently resided at the "National Homestead at Gettysburg" (opened October 1866) for 3 years until the widow remarried, when they relocated to Massachusetts.

Historiography
After numerous postbellum retellings and a 1993 memorial regarding the story at Gettysburg, Pennsylvania, historian Mark H. Dunkelman published Humiston's 1999 biography using Humiston's war letters—including a May 1863 poem of how Humiston missed his family.

In popular culture
Humiston's service at Gettysburg is dramatized in 2011 documentary Gettysburg.

In the 2012 film Abraham Lincoln Vampire Hunter, a Federal unit, presumably the 154th New York Volunteer Infantry, is attacked by Confederate vampires and only one member survives. A photograph falls out of a soldier's hand and falls to the ground near the camera. It is the same one that Sergeant Humiston carried.

References

1830 births
1863 deaths
People from Cattaraugus County, New York
People from Owego, New York

People of New York (state) in the American Civil War
Union Army soldiers
Union military personnel killed in the American Civil War
Burials at Gettysburg National Cemetery